The Flettner Fl 185 was an experimental German gyrodyne developed by Anton Flettner, a machine which could fly both as a helicopter and as a gyroplane.

Design and development
This aircraft was developed in 1936 with support of the Kriegsmarine. It was powered by a  BMW-Bramo Sh 14 A radial piston engine with forced-air cooling, mounted at the nose. The engine drove a 12 m diameter main rotor and two auxiliary propellers mounted on outriggers attached to the fuselage.

At take-off or when hovering, the auxiliary propellers worked in opposition to each other and served to cancel the torque of the main rotor, a function handled by a single, variable-pitch tail rotor on contemporary helicopters. In forward flight, however, both propellers worked to provide forward thrust while the rotor autorotated, as in a twin-engined autogyro. The landing gear consisted of a nose-wheel, two smaller stabilising wheels under the outriggers and a tail skid. Only one prototype was constructed.

Specifications (Fl 185)

See also
Fairey FB-1 Gyrodyne

Notes

References

Further reading
Die Deutsche Luftrüstung 1933–1945 

1930s German experimental aircraft
1930s German helicopters
Flettner aircraft